Marco Branca (born 6 January 1965) is an Italian former professional football striker who was, until February 2014, sporting director of Serie A club Internazionale.

Club career

Early career
Born in Grosseto, Branca started his playing career with Grosseto, the then-amateur local team of his native city, but was soon signed by Cagliari, where he made his professional debut. He then moved to Udinese, Sampdoria and then again to Udinese. Following another season with Sampdoria, he signed first for Fiorentina and then for Parma. In 1995, he transferred to A.S. Roma, who sold him in the 1996 winter transfer window to Internazionale in exchange for Marco Delvecchio.

Internazionale and Middlesbrough
In his first season with the Nerazzuri, Branca scored an impressive 17 goals in 24 matches, but did not repeat in his next campaign and was sold to English second-tier side Middlesbrough. Branca scored nine goals in 12 league games for Middlesbrough, including two on his league debut in a 3–1 victory against Sunderland, a hat-trick versus Bury and another two in the 6–0 win over Swindon Town. In addition, he played two League Cup games, scoring the second goal against Liverpool in the semi-final second leg on his debut. His nine goals aided in Boro's promotion to the Premiership, he was then injured and Middlesbrough claimed insurance on his value and he was released from his contract. He chased Middlesbrough through the courts before signing for Swiss club FC Luzern.

Later career
Branca saw out his playing days with FC Luzern and Italian lower-league club Monza before retiring in 2001.

International career
Branca took part in the 1996 Summer Olympics as overage player.

Management career
From 2002 until February 2014, Branca was part of Internazionale's management, working in their transfer network. He helped organise the transfers of Lúcio, Diego Milito, Thiago Motta, Wesley Sneijder and Samuel Eto'o.

Honours

Club
Sampdoria
 Serie A: 1990–91
Parma
 UEFA Cup: 1994–95

References

External links
Playing career

1965 births
Living people
People from Grosseto
Italian footballers
Association football forwards
Cagliari Calcio players
A.C. Monza players
Udinese Calcio players
ACF Fiorentina players
U.C. Sampdoria players
A.S. Roma players
Parma Calcio 1913 players
Inter Milan players
Middlesbrough F.C. players
FC Luzern players
Serie A players
Serie B players
Premier League players
Swiss Super League players
Footballers at the 1996 Summer Olympics
Olympic footballers of Italy
Italian expatriate footballers
Expatriate footballers in Switzerland
Expatriate footballers in England
Italian expatriate sportspeople in Switzerland
Italian expatriate sportspeople in England
UEFA Cup winning players
Sportspeople from the Province of Grosseto
Footballers from Tuscany